This is a list of crime films released in 2005.

References

2000s
2005-related lists